"Fifi" is the eighth episode of the second season of the AMC television series Better Call Saul, the spinoff series of Breaking Bad. The episode aired on April 4, 2016 on AMC in the United States. Outside of the United States, the episode premiered on streaming service Netflix in several countries.

Plot
Jimmy McGill accepts Kim Wexler's offer to set up separate firms in shared office space, and Kim announces to Howard Hamlin her resignation from HHM. Howard accepts and wishes her well. Immediately after Kim exits Howard's office, Howard and she race to secure the Mesa Verde account. Kim meets with Kevin Wachtell and Paige Novick, Mesa Verde's president and chief legal counsel, and they agree to become a client of her solo practice. Kim and Jimmy set up their practices in a re-purposed dentists' office. Howard reports Kim's resignation and the loss of Mesa Verde to Chuck. Chuck braves his electromagnetic hypersensitivity symptoms to meet with Kevin and Paige at HHM and damns Kim with faint praise, which causes Kevin to back out of his agreement with Kim and continue with HHM. Chuck is unable to continue suppressing his EHS symptoms and collapses as soon as the meeting is over.

Jimmy pretends Fudge, an elderly registered sex offender, is a World War II veteran so his camera crew and he can gain access to a U.S. Air Force base.  Once inside, they use FIFI, a World War II-era Boeing B-29 Superfortress, as the backdrop for a TV ad to attract new clients to Jimmy's elder law practice. Upset at losing Mesa Verde, Kim has doubts about her future with Jimmy, but he reassures her there will be other opportunities to win over big clients.

Ernesto tells Jimmy that Chuck McGill's condition has worsened because of his time at HHM's offices. Jimmy goes to Chuck's home and volunteers to take over Chuck's care. After Chuck falls asleep, Jimmy accesses the Mesa Verde files, then visits an all-night copy store to falsify information in the application documents for a soon-to-open branch. Mike Ehrmantraut continues to watch Hector Salamanca's restaurant and tracks his movements to a remote garage. After returning home, he uses a garden hose, nails, and power drill to begin assembling a homemade spike strip.

Opening shot 
The opening shot of this episode is notable for being a 4-minute and 22-second seamless "one shot". The shot was inspired by the famous opening shot of Orson Welles's Touch of Evil, and used techniques including 3D digital elements and animation, matte paintings, and extensive rotoscope. The episode was nominated for a Primetime Emmy for "Outstanding Special Visual Effects in a Supporting Role" for the work done.

Reception

Ratings
Upon airing, the episode received 1.93 million American viewers, and an 18-49 rating of 0.8.

Critical reception
The episode received very positive reviews from critics. It holds a perfect 100% positive rating with an average score of 8.2 out of 10 on the review aggregator site Rotten Tomatoes. The critics' consensus reads:  "Emotionally foreboding and beautifully shot, "Fifi" draws empathy for several key characters, even those normally disliked."

Terri Schwartz of IGN gave the episode an 8.7 rating, writing "A sabotage of a sabotage as Jimmy and Kim try to set up a new law practice."

This episode was nominated at the 68th Primetime Creative Arts Emmy Awards for Outstanding Special Visual Effects in a Supporting Role.

References

External links
 "Fifi"  at AMC
 

Better Call Saul (season 2) episodes